The 2005 Vaahteraliiga season was the 26th season of the highest level of American football in Finland. The regular season took place between June 4 and August 28, 2005. The Finnish champion was determined in the playoffs and at the championship game Vaahteramalja XXVI the Porvoo Butchers won the Seinäjoki Crocodiles.

Standings

Playoffs

References 

American football in Finland
Vaahteraliiga
Vaahteraliiga